The 6th Gujarat Legislative Assembly election was held in 1977. Indian National Congress (INC) won 141 seats out of 182 seats. While, Janata Party (JP) won 21 seats and Bharatiya Janata Party (BJP) won nine seats. INC performed better in this election and gained 66 seats.  

A total of 950 men and 24 women contested the election. Total 177 men and 5 women won in elections. The number of polling stations was 21,137 and the number of electors per polling station was 785.

Results

Elected members

References 

State Assembly elections in Gujarat
1980s in Gujarat
Gujarat